Futbol Clube San Francisco Masachapa is a Nicaraguan football team currently playing in the Nicaraguan Primera División. They are based in Nandasmo.

History
The club was first founded in 2009 at Diriamba; during this period they were crowned champion of the third division after winning 6–1 on aggregate against Brumas FC de Jinotega.

However, two years later, due to financial trouble, the club moved to San Rafael del Sur with the intention to call themselves the now defunct Masachapa which disappeared in 2004–2005.

However FENIFUT did not allow them and they changed their names to San Francisco Masachapa.

The Club won promotion to the primera division, after winning the promotion/relegation playoff against Deportivo Sebaco 3–2 2017 season and for the first time in the club history.

Current squad

Achievements
Segunda División de Nicaragua: 1
2017
Tercera División de Nicaragua: 1
2009

Notable players

List of Coaches
  Jeffry Perez

External links
 

Football clubs in Nicaragua